The discography of Monkey Majik consists of thirteen studio albums, five compilation albums and numerous singles and digital downloads. The band's releases were originally self-released in Sendai, after which they were signed to independent label and management Under Horse Records, and released material through there between 2004 and 2005. In 2005, Monkey Majik were signed to major label Avex Entertainment, and continue to release under the Binyl Records sub-label.

Monkey Majik have four certified albums by the RIAJ, including the platinum Sora wa Marude (2007). They have five songs that were commercially successful enough to receive certifications, including the double platinum "Around the World" (2006) and "Sora wa Marude" (2007).

Albums

Studio albums

Compilation albums

Extended plays

Singles

References

Pop music discographies
Discographies of Japanese artists